The Fulton Democrat  is a newspaper in Fulton County, Illinois. It was founded in July 1855 by James Monroe Davidson.

In 1860, William Taylor Davidson (1837-1915) was the sole owner and editor.

References

External links 
 Website
 The Fulton Democrat - Sesquicentennial Edition

Publications established in 1855
Fulton County, Illinois
Newspapers published in Illinois
1855 establishments in Illinois